The Women's individual competition of the Beijing 2022 Olympics was held on 7 February, at the National Biathlon Centre, in the Zhangjiakou cluster of competition venues,  north of Beijing, at an elevation of . The Olympic champion was Denise Herrmann of Germany. Anaïs Chevalier-Bouchet of France won the silver medal, and Marte Olsbu Røiseland of Norway the bronze. For Herrmann and Chevalier-Bouchet it was the first individual Olympic medal.

Summary
The defending champion was Hanna Öberg. The 2018 silver medalist, Anastasiya Kuzmina, and bronze medalist, Laura Dahlmeier, retired from competitions. The overall leader of the 2021–22 Biathlon World Cup before the Olympics was Røiseland, and the leader in the individual was Markéta Davidová who was also the defending world champion.

Qualification

Results
The race was started at 17:00.

References

Biathlon at the 2022 Winter Olympics
Women's biathlon at the 2022 Winter Olympics